Zelnick is a surname of Jewish origin, meaning either "haberdashery" or "tax collector". Notable people with the surname include:

Mel Zelnick (1924-2008), American jazz drummer
Robert Zelnick (1940-2019), American journalist and professor
Strauss Zelnick (born 1957), American businessman

See also
Aldo Zelnick, a comic novel children's book series
Zelnik (surname)